Boznabad-e Jadid (also Romanized as Boznābād-e Jadīd; also known as Boznābād, Būznābād, and Buznābād) is a village in Mahyar Rural District, in the Central District of Qaen County, South Khorasan Province, Iran. At the 2006 census, its population was 549, in 139 families.

References 

Populated places in Qaen County